Growing Pains  is a short-running British television series aired by the BBC on BBC1. The show ran for two series, from 16 May 1992 to 14 July 1993, and was unrelated to the popular 80s American sitcom of the same name. In this family comedy drama a middle-aged couple, Tom and Pat Hollingsworth, decide to become foster parents. The show relates the consequences this decision has on their lives and the tensions it causes between them and their own three children. The TV series was a continuation of the 1989–1990 radio series by the same name, which was written by, and partly based on the real-life experiences of Steve Wetton. It was directed by Michael Simpson.

Growing Pains is notable for including the debut acting role of actress Lily Collins. Collins was a 2 year old infant when she appeared on the show.

The lead roles of Pat and Tom Hollingsworth were played by Ray Brooks and Sharon Duce in both the radio show and the television series. The television cast of the Hollingsworth family also included Tat Whalley as Mark Hollingsworth, Peter Lloyd as Simon Hollingsworth, and Rosie Marcel as Lisa Hollingsworth. Liz Crowther, Lill Roughley and Trevor Peacock also appeared regularly on the show.
 
The show's musical theme was composed by Nigel Hess.

References

External links
 

1992 British television series debuts
1993 British television series endings
1990s British drama television series
BBC television dramas
British comedy-drama television shows
English-language television shows